David Mor (born 20 September 1946) is an Israeli businessman and former politician who briefly served as a member of the Knesset for Likud in 1988.

Biography
During the 1980s he was chairman of the board of directors of the government development company, Shikun VePituah. He won on the Likud list for the 1984 elections, but failed to win a seat. However, he entered the Knesset on 27 October 1988, replacing Michael Reisser, who had been killed in a car crash. However, he lost his seat in the November elections.

Today he lives in Savyon and is married with three children. He is the father-in-law of Amos Mansdorf.

References

External links

1941 births
Israeli civil servants
Israeli businesspeople
Living people
Likud politicians
Members of the 11th Knesset (1984–1988)